Norway competed at the 2015 World Aquatics Championships in Kazan, Russia from 24 July to 9 August 2015.

Diving

Norwegian divers qualified for the individual spots and synchronized teams at the World Championships.

Men

Swimming

Norwegian swimmers have achieved qualifying standards in the following events (up to a maximum of 2 swimmers in each event at the A-standard entry time, and 1 at the B-standard):

Men

Women

References

External links
Norges Svømmeforbund 

Nations at the 2015 World Aquatics Championships
2015 in Norwegian sport
Norway at the World Aquatics Championships